Calcutta is a 1969 French documentary film about Calcutta, directed by Louis Malle. It was entered into the 1969 Cannes Film Festival.

References

External links

1969 films
1960s French-language films
French documentary films
Films directed by Louis Malle
Films set in Kolkata
1969 documentary films
Documentary films about cities
Documentary films about India
1960s French films